Garsen–Witu–Lamu Highway is a road, under construction in Kenya, connecting the towns of Garsen,  Witu and Lamu.

Location

Overview
This road, is an important trade corridor for traffic headed from Nairobi, South Sudan and Ethiopia, to the proposed Port Lamu and is a  component of the Lamu-Moyale Highway, part of LAPSSET.

Upgrade and funding
The government of Kenya, using locally sourced funds, plans to upgrade the entire road to class II bitumen surface with shoulders, culverts and drainage channels. Kenya National Highway Authority is handling the hiring of a qualified, competent contractor to carry on the work.

As of December 2018, construction works were approximately 20 percent complete, with a completion date of December 2019.

In December 2020 The EastAfrican newspaper reported construction progress at 75 percent, with commissioning expected in October 2021.

In March 2021, The Star Kenya reported work progress at an estimated 87 percent complete. Completion is expected later in 2021.

See also
 List of roads in Kenya
 LAPSSET
 B8 road (Kenya)

References

External links
 Webpage of the Kenya National Highway Authority
  Highways agency seeks Nema nod for Lamu-Garissa road

Roads in Kenya
Geography of Kenya
Transport in Kenya
Lamu County
Tana River County